Tehran International & Adaptive School (TIS) is an international school located in North Tehran, Iran. It consists of three campuses: girls, boys elementary and boys grade 7–12. The school offers the International Baccalaureate's IB Diploma Programme. Boys attend school in Saadat Abad, while girls attend school in Shahrak-e Gharb. There are two divisions per school: an international school for non-Iranians, which enrolled only a few Iranian nationals; and a re-adaptive school for Iranians living abroad who need to re-adjust to the Iranian educational system.

It was established in 1985 under the Education Ministry of Iran.

Operations
Boys in the international school are expected to wear light blue collared shirts and dark blue trousers as part of their school uniform, while boys in the re-adaptive school are expected to wear blue collared shirts and dark blue trousers. Girls are expected to wear manto with maghnaeh.

References

External links

 Tehran International School (Archive)

Educational institutions established in 1985
International Baccalaureate schools in Iran
International schools in Tehran
1985 establishments in Iran
High schools in Iran